The 1974 Tasmanian Australian National Football League (TANFL) premiership season was an Australian rules football competition staged in Hobart, Tasmania over twenty-one (21) roster rounds and four (4) finals series matches between 6 April and 5 October 1974.

Participating Clubs
Clarence District Football Club
Glenorchy District Football Club
Hobart Football Club
New Norfolk District Football Club
North Hobart Football Club
Sandy Bay Football Club

1974 TANFL Club Coaches
Robin Norris (Clarence)
Trevor Sprigg (Glenorchy)
Trevor Leo (Hobart)
Geoff Hill (New Norfolk)
John Devine (North Hobart)
Rod Olsson (Sandy Bay)

TANFL Reserves Grand Final
Nth Hobart 17.6 (108) v Glenorchy 13.13 (91) – North Hobart Oval

TANFL Under-19's Grand Final
(Saturday, 12 October 1974)
 Glenorchy 11.7 (73) v Clarence 5.9 (39) – Boyer Oval

Intrastate Match
Inter-Association Match (Saturday, 8 June 1974)
TANFL 12.10 (82) v Huon FA 8.18 (66) – Att: 1,600 at Huonville Recreation Ground.

Leading Goalkickers: TANFL
Frank Ogle (Glenorchy) – 55
Terry Mayne (Clarence) – 46
Nigel Ricketts (Sandy Bay) – 43
Chris Saunders (Sandy Bay) – 43

Medal Winners
Tony Browning (New Norfolk) – William Leitch Medal
P.Smith (Clarence) – George Watt Medal (Reserves)
L.Berwick (Glenorchy) – V.A Geard Medal (Under-19's)

1974 TANFL Ladder

Round 1
(Saturday, 6 April 1974)
Nth Hobart 10.20 (80) v Glenorchy 9.10 (64) – Att: 4,037 at North Hobart Oval
New Norfolk 20.19 (139) v Hobart 17.11 (113) – Att: 1,884 at TCA Ground
Sandy Bay 17.11 (113) v Clarence 7.20 (62) – Att: 3,146 at Bellerive Oval

Round 2
(Saturday, 13 April & Monday, 15 April 1974)
New Norfolk 16.16 (112) v Glenorchy 9.18 (72) – Att: 2,918 at North Hobart Oval
Nth Hobart 21.19 (145) v Sandy Bay 10.14 (74) – Att: 3,096 at Queenborough Oval
Hobart 15.16 (106) v Clarence 11.15 (81) – Att: 4,498 at North Hobart Oval (Monday)

Round 3
(Saturday, 20 April 1974)
Hobart 19.14 (128) v Nth Hobart 15.15 (105) – Att: 4,536 at North Hobart Oval
Glenorchy 14.9 (93) v Sandy Bay 11.19 (85) – Att: 2,605 at KGV Football Park
Clarence 12.13 (85) v New Norfolk 11.8 (74) – Att: 1,925 at Boyer Oval

Round 4
(Thursday, 25 April & Saturday, 27 April 1974)
Sandy Bay 17.20 (122) v New Norfolk 9.7 (61) – Att: 3,674 at North Hobart Oval (Anzac Day)
Glenorchy 14.15 (99) v Hobart 11.14 (80) – Att: 4,032 at North Hobart Oval (Saturday)
Clarence 14.25 (109) v Nth Hobart 16.11 (107) – Att: 3,205 at Bellerive Oval (Saturday)

Round 5
(Saturday, 4 May 1974)
New Norfolk 17.16 (118) v Nth Hobart 13.11 (89) – Att: 3,457 at North Hobart Oval
Sandy Bay 22.18 (150) v Hobart 10.8 (68) – Att: 2,779 at Queenborough Oval
Clarence 16.13 (109) v Glenorchy 16.12 (108) – Att: 3,224 at KGV Football Park

Round 6
(Saturday, 11 May 1974)
Sandy Bay 18.14 (122) v Clarence 7.6 (48) – Att: 3,684 at North Hobart Oval
New Norfolk 15.21 (111) v Hobart 14.17 (101) – Att: 1,692 at TCA Ground
Nth Hobart 14.23 (107) v Glenorchy 12.16 (88) – Att: 4,123 at KGV Football Park

Round 7
(Saturday, 18 May 1974)
Nth Hobart 14.17 (101) v Sandy Bay 11.11 (77) – Att: 5,105 at North Hobart Oval
New Norfolk 13.11 (89) v Glenorchy 12.17 (89) – Att: 2,147 at Boyer Oval
Clarence 14.15 (99) v Hobart 8.13 (61) – Att: 2,127 at Bellerive Oval

Round 8
(Saturday, 25 May 1974)
Clarence 21.12 (138) v New Norfolk 9.13 (67) – Att: 3,005 at North Hobart Oval
Glenorchy 16.8 (104) v Sandy Bay 14.17 (101) – Att: 2,772 at Queenborough Oval
Hobart 13.17 (95) v Nth Hobart 14.11 (95) – Att: 2,477 at TCA Ground

Round 9
(Saturday, 1 June 1974)
Clarence 16.12 (108) v Nth Hobart 13.14 (92) – Att: 4,651 at North Hobart Oval
Sandy Bay 21.8 (134) v New Norfolk 17.9 (111) – Att: 2,071 at Queenborough Oval
Glenorchy 19.18 (132) v Hobart 8.7 (55) – Att: 2,710 at KGV Football Park

Round 10
(Saturday, 8 June. Saturday, 15 June & Monday, 17 June 1974)
Nth Hobart 11.10 (76) v New Norfolk 7.12 (54) – Att: 2,734 at North Hobart Oval (8 June)
Hobart 11.12 (78) v Sandy Bay 7.11 (53) – Att: 3,329 at North Hobart Oval (15 June)
Glenorchy 13.12 (90) v Clarence 11.7 (73) – Att: 5,784 at North Hobart Oval (17 June)

Round 11
(Saturday, 22 June 1974)
Glenorchy 11.11 (77) v Nth Hobart 8.7 (55) – Att: 4,442 at North Hobart Oval
Hobart 14.11 (95) v New Norfolk 9.7 (61) – Att: 1,430 at Boyer Oval
Sandy Bay 9.22 (76) v Clarence 2.6 (18) – Att: 2,473 at Bellerive Oval

Round 12
(Saturday, 29 June 1974)
Glenorchy 12.29 (101) v New Norfolk 12.16 (88) – Att: 2,722 at North Hobart Oval
Clarence 16.11 (107) v Hobart 13.8 (86) – Att: 2,190 at TCA Ground
Sandy Bay 12.15 (87) v Nth Hobart 10.6 (66) – Att: 2,841 at Queenborough Oval

Round 13
(Saturday, 6 July 1974)
Nth Hobart 8.8 (56) v Hobart 7.12 (54) – Att: 2,199 at North Hobart Oval
New Norfolk 14.20 (104) v Clarence 9.12 (66) – Att: 1,210 at Boyer Oval
Glenorchy 11.11 (77) v Sandy Bay 8.12 (60) – Att: 2,427 at KGV Football Park

Round 14
(Saturday, 20 July 1974)
Nth Hobart 8.16 (64) v New Norfolk 8.6 (54) – Att: 2,129 at North Hobart Oval
Sandy Bay 10.11 (71) v Hobart 4.9 (33) – Att: 1,682 at TCA Ground
Glenorchy 11.12 (78) v Clarence 6.11 (47) – Att: 1,880 at Bellerive Oval
Note: This round was postponed on 13 July due to inclement weather conditions.

Round 15
(Saturday, 3 August 1974)
Sandy Bay 20.19 (139) v Nth Hobart 9.7 (61) – Att: 3,010 at North Hobart Oval
Hobart 10.14 (74) v Clarence 6.16 (52) – Att: 1,671 at Bellerive Oval
Glenorchy 24.14 (158) v New Norfolk 6.6 (42) – Att: 2,331 at KGV Football Park
Note: Originally this was scheduled as Round 16. Round 15 (27 July) was postponed due to poor weather and ground conditions and was eventually replayed on 14 September as Round 21.

Round 16
(Saturday, 10 August 1974)
Sandy Bay 16.14 (110) v Glenorchy 12.9 (81) – Att: 4,822 at North Hobart Oval
Hobart 10.13 (73) v Nth Hobart 8.12 (60) – Att: 1,184 at Boyer Oval *
Clarence 16.15 (111) v New Norfolk 10.19 (79) – Att: 1,322 at Queenborough Oval *
Note: Matches scheduled at the TCA Ground and Bellerive Oval switched due to poor ground conditions.

Round 17
(Saturday, 17 August 1974)
Clarence 18.16 (124) v Nth Hobart 13.9 (87) – Att: 3,515 at North Hobart Oval
New Norfolk 8.17 (65) v Sandy Bay 6.15 (51) – Att: 1,312 at Boyer Oval
Hobart 12.12 (84) v Glenorchy 12.11 (83) – Att: 2,016 at TCA Ground

Round 18
(Saturday, 24 August 1974)
Glenorchy 12.8 (80) v Clarence 11.11 (77) – Att: 4,042 at North Hobart Oval
Sandy Bay 14.10 (94) v Hobart 11.12.(78) – Att: 2,466 at Queenborough Oval
Nth Hobart 17.15 (117) v New Norfolk 8.13 (61) – Att: 1,732 at Boyer Oval

Round 19
(Saturday, 31 August 1974)
Nth Hobart 16.15 (111) v Glenorchy 11.14 (80) – Att: 3,755 at North Hobart Oval
Hobart 13.15 (93) v New Norfolk 9.12 (66) – Att: 1,270 at Boyer Oval
Sandy Bay 13.16 (94) v Clarence 14.10.(94) – Att: 2,783 at Queenborough Oval

Round 20
(Saturday, 7 September 1974)
New Norfolk 12.16 (88) v Sandy Bay 8.11 (59) – Att: 1,562 at North Hobart Oval
Nth Hobart 14.3 (87) v Clarence 10.9 (69) – Att: 2,487 at Bellerive Oval
Hobart 11.13 (79) v Glenorchy 5.12 (42) – Att: 1,965 at TCA Ground

Round 21
(Saturday, 14 September 1974)
New Norfolk 13.11 (89) v Hobart 10.14 (74) – Att: 1,997 at North Hobart Oval
Clarence 14.16 (100) v Sandy Bay 12.9 (81) – Att: 2,605 at Queenborough Oval
Glenorchy 12.18 (90) v Nth Hobart 11.10 (76) – Att: 2,937 at KGV Football Park
Note: This round was originally scheduled as Round 15 to be played on 27 July but was postponed due to poor weather.

First Semi Final
(Saturday, 21 September 1974)
Nth Hobart: 3.4 (22) | 9.4 (58) | 13.10 (88) | 15.16 (106)
Clarence: 3.3 (21) | 5.7 (37) | 5.9 (39) | 8.17 (65)
Attendance: 7,795 at North Hobart Oval

Second Semi Final
(Sunday, 22 September 1974)
Sandy Bay: 3.2 (20) | 7.6 (48) | 8.13 (61) | 15.15 (105)
Glenorchy: 6.6 (42) | 8.8 (56) | 9.9 (63) | 12.14 (86)
Attendance: 7,850 at North Hobart Oval

Preliminary Final
(Saturday, 28 September 1974)
Nth Hobart: 5.5 (35) | 11.8 (74) | 15.9 (99) | 20.10 (130)
Glenorchy: 1.2 (8) | 3.7 (25) | 8.11 (59) | 12.17 (89)
Attendance: 8,427 at North Hobart Oval

Grand Final
(Saturday, 5 October 1974)
Nth Hobart: 5.1 (31) | 13.6 (84) | 15.9 (99) | 21.10 (136)
Sandy Bay: 4.5 (29) | 4.8 (32) | 11.13 (79) | 15.18 (108)
Attendance: 16,234 at North Hobart Oval

Source: All scores and statistics courtesy of the Hobart Mercury and Saturday Evening Mercury (SEM) publications, also Tasmanian Football Record publications.

Tasmanian Football League seasons